Václavice is a municipality and village in Benešov District in the Central Bohemian Region of the Czech Republic. It has about 600 inhabitants.

Administrative parts
Villages of Vatěkov and Zbožnice are administrative parts of Václavice.

Gallery

References

Villages in Benešov District